Hans-Ulrich Thomale (born 6 December 1944) is a German football manager and former player.

Career
Thomale played as a defensive midfielder and defender for 1. FC Lokomotive Leipzig and BSG Stahl Riesa in the DDR-Oberliga.

Thomale has been the manager and sporting director for former club 1. FC Lokomotive Leipzig. He also managed Chinese Jia-B League club Chengdu Wuniu in 1998.

References

1944 births
Living people
East German footballers
Dresdner SC players
East German football managers
German football managers
FC Erzgebirge Aue managers
1. FC Lokomotive Leipzig managers
Grazer AK managers
KSV Hessen Kassel managers
FC 08 Homburg managers
KFC Uerdingen 05 managers
FC Rot-Weiß Erfurt managers
Association football defenders
German expatriate football managers
Expatriate football managers in Austria
German expatriate sportspeople in Austria
Expatriate football managers in China
German expatriate sportspeople in China
Footballers from Saxony
People from Meissen (district)
DDR-Oberliga players
People from Bezirk Dresden